The 2000 Tirreno–Adriatico was the 35th edition of the Tirreno–Adriatico cycle race and was held from 8 March to 15 March 2000. The race started in Sorrento and finished in San Benedetto del Tronto. The race was won by Abraham Olano of the ONCE team.

General classification

References

2000
2000 in Italian sport